, also known by  and his Chinese style name , was a bureaucrat of the Ryukyu Kingdom.

Biography
Urasoe Chōri was a son of Urasoe Chōshi, and was also an younger brother of Kunigami Chōchi. He was elected as a member of Sanshikan in 1636.

Disappearance
A Spanish ship docked at Ishigaki Island in 1624. Juan de los Angeles Rueda, who was a missionary of the Dominican Order, preached to local people. Though Christianity was banned by Japan at that time, Rueda was sheltered by a local officer Ishigaki Eishō. He was uncovered in 1634, resulting with both Ishigaki and Rueda sent into exile and later executed. This incident was known by Yaeyama Kirishitan Incident. After this incident, Ryukyu started to investigate religious beliefs of its people, and forced Christians to convert (Shūmon-aratame ). Urasoe Chōri went to Satsuma to report the result of Shūmon-aratame, but on the way home, his ship was caught in a storm and disappeared in the sea. His position was vacant until 1641.

See also
List of people who disappeared mysteriously at sea

References

1630s missing person cases
1638 deaths
17th-century Ryukyuan people
Deaths due to shipwreck at sea
Missing person cases in Asia
People lost at sea
People of the Ryukyu Kingdom
Ryukyuan people
Sanshikan
Ueekata